The Mauritanian Super Cup is a Mauritanian football competition, held as a game between the reigning champions of the Mauritanian Premier League and the Mauritanian Cup. The first edition was held in 2003.

Winners

2015 Super Cup controversy
In November 2015, Mohamed Ould Abdel Aziz, President of Mauritania, reportedly ordered the 2015 Mauritanian Super Cup to go to a penalty shootout in the 63rd minute with the score tied 1–1 because he was getting bored with the match. The Mauritania Football Federation has denied claims of the president's involvement, instead saying the decision was made due to "organisational issues", in accordance with the presidents and coaches of both teams.

See also
 Mauritanian Premier League
 Mauritanian Cup

References

External links
 Mauritania Cup and Super Cup Winners - rsssf.com

Football competitions in Mauritania
National association football supercups